The coordinates are missing.

Convent of Jesus & Mary High School was founded in 2002. A Junior College was added in 2012 for the Commerce stream of education. Located in Kharghar, Navi Mumbai, the school is run by the Congregation of the Religious of Jesus and Mary.
It is a school as well as a junior college in commerce stream. The school has got a large football ground, basketball court and children play area. Various competitions are held regularly to improve academic as well as sport skills.

References 

Catholic secondary schools in India
Junior colleges in Maharashtra
Christian schools in Maharashtra
High schools and secondary schools in Mumbai
Educational institutions established in 2002
2002 establishments in Maharashtra